Deutsche Allgemeine Zeitung (often abbreviated to DAZ) was a German newspaper that appeared between 1861 and 1945.

Until 1918 the title of the paper was Norddeutsche Allgemeine Zeitung. Although Wilhelm Liebknecht, one of the founders of SPD and close associate of Karl Marx and Friedrich Engels, was member of the founding editorial board in 1861, the paper became soon a conservative flagship of the German press ("Bismarcks Hauspostille"). At the end of the First World War, the name was changed to "Deutsche Allgemeine Zeitung", under the intention to form a conservative and democratic equivalent to the British newspaper The Times in Germany and give the Reich a more democratic image. Various liberal and conservative writers worked for DAZ at that time, Otto Flake was head of the Cultural Section ( called "Feuilleton" in German newspapers ), people like the historian Egmont Zechlin, the journalist Dr. Friedrich Schrader and his Swiss colleague from Constantinople Max Rudolf Kaufmann worked for the paper.

In the early 1920s, Hans Humann controlled the newspaper, which repeatedly denied and justified the Armenian genocide. Following the assassination of Talat Pasha in March 1921 the newspaper launched an aggressive anti-Armenian campaign, claiming in one article that murder and backstabbing was "the true Armenian manner".

Hugo Stinnes took over the DAZ in 1920 in an effort to secure industrialist influence.  Stinnes invested in the newspaper, and it enjoyed a short period of financial success. The DAZ became increasingly conservative. Paul Lensch, a former left-wing socialist associated with Rosa Luxemburg, later during the war part of the right wing "Lensch-Cunow-Haenisch-Gruppe" within the SPD (itself associated with and financed by the German-Russian-Jewish socialist Alexander Parvus), became foreign policy editor, and later editor in chief of DAZ, which he edited until his death in 1926.  After the death of Lensch, until when the paper was a conservative supporter of the Weimar coalition (Stinnes was associated with Gustav Stresemann and his DVP), the paper became, like the DVP itself, increasingly right wing and closer to the Hugenberg press and anti-democratic right-wing circles. After Stinnes' (and Lensch's) death, the Prussian government secretly bought the DAZ in 1925.  Less than a year later, the Reich government took it over, but it was sold again when the affair came to light.

By 1930, the DAZ had declined and was suffering large losses.

References

External links 
 
Access to NAZ and DAZ on Hypress. 
DAZ in digital form, years 1918-1931

Newspapers established in 1861
Publications disestablished in 1945
Newspapers published in Berlin
1861 establishments in Germany
Armenian genocide denial
Anti-Armenianism in Europe
1945 disestablishments in Germany
German nationalism